On April 12, 1861, South Carolina artillery opened fire on Fort Sumter to start the American Civil War. While many gold seekers in the Colorado Territory held sympathies for the Confederacy, the vast majority remained fiercely loyal to the Union cause. An infantry and two cavalry regiments, as well an artillery battery, were sent to the support Union operations; others were raised for internal defense.

In 1862, a force of Texas cavalry invaded the Territory of New Mexico and captured Santa Fe on March 10. The object of this Western Campaign was to seize or disrupt the gold fields of Colorado and California and to seize ports on the Pacific Ocean for the Confederacy. A hastily organized force of Colorado volunteers force-marched from Denver City, Colorado Territory, to Glorieta Pass, New Mexico Territory, in an attempt to block the Texans. On March 28, the Coloradans and local New Mexico volunteers stopped the Texans at the Battle of Glorieta Pass, destroyed their cannon and supply wagons, and ran off 500 of their horses and mules. The Texans were forced to retreat to Santa Fe. Having lost the supplies for their campaign and finding little support in New Mexico, the Texans abandoned Santa Fe and returned to San Antonio in defeat. The Confederacy made no further attempts to seize the Southwestern United States.

References

Bibliography 
 Dyer, Frederick H. (1959). A Compendium of the War of the Rebellion. New York and London. Thomas Yoseloff, Publisher. .

See also 
 Lists of American Civil War Regiments by State

 
Colorado
Civil War units
Colorado Territory
Civil War